Grant Gallagher (born 11 January 1991) is a Scottish footballer who is a utility player for Scottish League One side Stranraer.

Career
Born in Irvine,
Grant, predominantly a right back and centre midfielder, began his career at Celtic but did not make a single first-team appearance. He was released by the club in Summer 2010. In August of that year Gallagher joined Stranraer, he spent five years with the Stair Park side, making over 200 appearances scoring 15 goals.

In May 2015, Gallagher signed a one-year contract with Scottish Championship side Dumbarton, joining up with former manager at Stranraer, Stephen Aitken. He scored his first goal for the club in a 2–0 friendly win over Hearts. He scored twice on his competitive debut in a 3–2 victory over Morton. After 37 appearances for the club and four goals he was rewarded with a new deal in May 2016. His second season with 'The Sons' was ended by injury in September, however he agreed a new contract with the club in May 2017 until the summer of 2018. On his return to action, Gallagher suffered an Anterior cruciate ligament injury in a friendly against Partick Thistle that ruled him out for at least a further 6 months. He returned to action on 31 March 2018, making his first league appearance in 18 months in a defeat to Livingston. He was subsequently released by the club in May 2018, and joined Airdrieonians whom he left after another injury hit season Gallagher rejoined Stranraer in May 2019.

References

External links

1991 births
Living people
Celtic F.C. players
Stranraer F.C. players
Dumbarton F.C. players
Scottish footballers
Scottish Football League players
Association football defenders
Scottish Professional Football League players
Association football midfielders
Airdrieonians F.C. players